Janet A. Thompson (born 15 March 1956 in Ealing, London) is an English retired competitive ice dancer. Her partner was  Warren Maxwell. They are the 1977 World silver medalists. They represented Great Britain at the 1976 Winter Olympics, where they placed 8th.

Competitive highlights

References

External links

1956 births
English female ice dancers
Figure skaters at the 1976 Winter Olympics
Olympic figure skaters of Great Britain
Living people
World Figure Skating Championships medalists